Samie Jabar Parker (born March 25, 1981) is an American football coach and former player. He is currently the wide receiver's coach at the University of North Alabama. Parker most recently played for the Toronto Argonauts of the Canadian Football League. He was drafted by the Kansas City Chiefs in the fourth round of the 2004 NFL Draft. He played college football at Oregon. Parker was also a member of the Denver Broncos, Carolina Panthers, Seattle Seahawks, Oakland Raiders, Chicago Rush, Las Vegas Locomotives and Los Angeles Kiss. He is currently a recruiting assistant at Washington State.

Early years
He graduated from Long Beach Polytechnic High School. where he also played pop warner.
Samie was an All-Star player for King Central little league. He was a center fielder and the lead off hitter. He was also very skilled at card tricks.

Professional career

Kansas City Chiefs

Parker was drafted by the Kansas City Chiefs in the fourth round of the 2004 NFL Draft. He played for them from 2004 to 2008.

Denver Broncos

Parker was signed by the Denver Broncos in the 2008 offseason; however, he was released on August 25 before the regular season.

Carolina Panthers

A day after being released by the Broncos, Parker was signed by the Carolina Panthers when the team waived wide receiver Sean Bailey. He was later released on August 30, 2008.

Seattle Seahawks

Parker was signed by the Seattle Seahawks on September 10, 2008. He was released three days later after the team signed wide receiver Michael Bumpus off its practice squad.

Oakland Raiders

Parker was signed by the Oakland Raiders on May 12, 2009. He was released on August 26 to make room for cornerback Mike Hawkins.

Las Vegas Locomotives
Parker played with the locomotives for the inaugural season of the UFL.

Chicago Rush
The Chicago Rush of the Arena Football League signed Parker for the team's 2010 season. Parker started 11 games for the Rush, catching 78 passes for 1,135 yards and 15 touchdowns.

Second stint with the Locomotives
Parker joined the locos for the second season of the UFL.

Toronto Argonauts
On March 29, 2012 Samie Parker signed with the Toronto Argonauts of the Canadian Football League. On Wednesday, June 20, Parker was released by the Argonauts.

Coaching career
On December 8, 2022, Parker was announced as the wide receivers coach at  North Alabama.

References

External links

Denver Broncos bio
Oakland Raiders bio
Toronto Argonauts bio

1981 births
Living people
Players of American football from Long Beach, California
American football wide receivers
Oregon Ducks football players
Kansas City Chiefs players
Denver Broncos players
Carolina Panthers players
Seattle Seahawks players
Oakland Raiders players
Las Vegas Locomotives players
Chicago Rush players
Kansas City Command players
Los Angeles Kiss players
Long Beach Polytechnic High School alumni